Hard Quiz is an Australian television comedy quiz show which premiered on the Australian Broadcasting Corporation (ABC) on 19 October 2016. Hosted by Tom Gleeson, the show is a spin-off of his "Hard Chat" segment on the satirical television news program The Weekly with Charlie Pickering. It is filmed at the ABC Melbourne studios in Southbank in front of a studio audience.

It is routine for Gleeson to mock the contestants or their subject and contestants often will make jokes at Gleeson's expense, all of which is accepted and appears to be encouraged.

Gleeson has claimed he was surprised by the success of the program, saying he had given up hope of being a star.

On 24 May 2019, Gleeson announced he was stepping down as host and quitting the program via a media release. On 26 May 2019, Gleeson was announced as a nominee for the Gold Logie Award for Most Popular Personality on Australian Television. He later tweeted that he would "un-axe" the show if he wins the Gold Logie. Gleeson subsequently won the Gold Logie and the show was announced to be returning on 31 July 2019.

It was announced by Gleeson on 31 July 2019, in a radio interview with Triple M, that the show's return in 2020 for its fifth series would see it expand to 40 new episodes.

Format
Each episode of Hard Quiz features four contestants, each of whom has selected a specialist subject area. No subject area (including those selected in "Tom's Round") may be used more than once. Each correct answer is worth 5 points, while each wrong answer costs 5 points.

Expert Round
The contestants, in turn, each receive five questions regarding their specialist subject areas. They must buzz in to respond and are locked out of a question if they got it wrong or took too long to give an answer, giving the other players a chance to answer. A contestant may attempt to answer a question from another contestant's subject area. This is known as "The Steal". If a Steal is successful, the contestant receives 10 points but will only lose 5 points for an incorrect Steal attempt (in series 1, a failed Steal resulted in the contestant losing 10 points).

Tom's Round
The contestants, using their monitors, lock in their answers to each of the five multiple-choice questions from a subject Gleeson has chosen in advance. A selected response must be locked in by pressing the red buzzer. Each question has 4 options except for the last question, which has 6 options and is played for double points (10 points for a right answer). The lowest scorer at the end of this round is out of the game.

The People's Round (Against The Clock)
In this round, general knowledge questions are given out for a rather vague time limit (between 35 and over 90 seconds, depending on the episode). The contestants, again, buzz in to respond. The lowest scorer when time expires is also out of the game.

Tiebreaker: Hard-Off
In the event of a tie for lowest scorer when an elimination is required, the tie is broken with a "Hard-Off", where Gleeson presents two options for a given question (often pertaining to the relative difficulty of two given tasks or physical hardness of two materials), which the first contestant to buzz in then answers. If the answering contestant chooses correctly, the other contestant is eliminated and vice versa if the answer given is incorrect.

When more than two contestants play a hard-off, multiple questions can be played. If a contestant answers correctly, they are safe from elimination and the hard-off continues until only one contestant is not safe. If a contestant answers incorrectly, they are eliminated and all other contestant in the hard-off become safe.

Final Round (Hard Quiz)
The final two contestants alternate answering questions regarding their chosen subject area in a best of five penalty shootout-style format with the winner receiving a trophy – the limited-edition big brass mug, or in the case of the "Battle of The Duds" episodes, the aforementioned big brass mug with a hole in the bottom. The contestant also gets to sign off the show with the catchphrase "Thanks for playing, hard."

Extra questions
If the final two contestants have got the same amount of correct answers after five questions, an extra question will be asked to each contestant on their specialty subject.

Tom's Tiebreaker
After the extra questions and if the players are still tied, one numerical question will be asked on Tom's specialty subject of the day. Each contestant will be required to guess the correct answer, starting with the player that got the first question during the final round and the closest of the two wins the show.

Series overview
<onlyinclude>

Episodes

Series 1 (2016)
Names in Bold are the winners

Series 2 (2017)
Names in Bold are the winners

Series 3 (2018–19)
Names in Bold are the winners

Series 4 (2019)
Names in Bold are the winners

Series 5 (2020-21)
Names in Bold are the winners

Series 6 (2021)
Names in Bold are the winners

Series 7 (2022)
Names in Bold are the winners

Season 8 (2023)
Names in Bold are the winners

Specials
Names in Bold are the winners

Awards and nominations

|-
|2017
|7th AACTA Awards
|Best Light Entertainment Series
|rowspan="3"|
|
|
|-
|rowspan="2"|2018
|8th AACTA Awards
|Best Entertainment Program
|
|
|-
|Logie Awards of 2018
|Most Popular Entertainment Program
|
|
|-
|rowspan="4"|2019
|rowspan="3"|Logie Awards of 2019
|Most Popular Personality on Australian Television
|rowspan="2"|
|
|rowspan="3"|
|-
|Most Popular Presenter
|
|-
|Most Popular Entertainment Program
|rowspan="4"|
|
|-
|AACTA Awards 
|rowspan="3"|Best Light Entertainment Television Series
|
|
|-
|2020
|AACTA Awards 
|
|
|-
|rowspan="3"|2021
|rowspan="3"|AACTA Awards 
|
|rowspan="3"|
|-
|Best Comedy Performer
|rowspan="2"|
|
|-
|Favourite Television Host
|
|-
|rowspan="6"|2022
|rowspan="4"|Logie Awards of 2022
|Most Popular Personality on Australian Television
|rowspan="2"|
|
|rowspan="4"|
|-
|Most Popular Presenter
|
|-
|Most Popular Entertainment Program
|rowspan="3"|
|
|-
|Most Outstanding Entertainment or Comedy Program
|
|-
|rowspan="2"|AACTA Awards 
|Best Comedy Program
|
|rowspan="2"|
|-
|Best Comedy Performer
|
|
|-

References

External links
 Official website

Australian Broadcasting Corporation original programming
2010s Australian game shows
2020s Australian game shows
English-language television shows
2016 Australian television series debuts
Television shows set in Melbourne
Australian television spin-offs
Quiz shows